Kenk is a surname. Notable people with the surname include: 

 Igor Kenk (born 1959), Canadian criminal
 Roman Kenk (1898–1988), Slovenian zoologist